The Flag Institute is a UK membership organisation headquartered in Kingston upon Hull, England, concerned with researching and promoting the use and design of flags. It documents flags in the UK and internationally, maintains a UK Flag Registry, and offers advice and guidance about flags and their usage. It is often consulted on matters relating to flag design and usage, but holds no official status or authority. It is a registered charity.

History and role

The institute was formed out of the Flag Section of The Heraldry Society on St George's Day, 23 April 1971, by William Crampton, later president of FIAV, with E.M.C. Barraclough as its chairman. It is a membership-based vexillological organisation with over 500 members from all parts of the world, and provides advice and assistance to individuals and organisations including UK Government departments, the BBC, ITN, and many publishers, museums and libraries.

The institute maintains the William Crampton Library, based in Kingston upon Hull, England and named in honour of its co-founder. It publishes a bi-annual journal, Flagmaster, and a virtual magazine called eFlags. Since 2006 it has sponsored an annual public lecture on a flag-related topic, known as the 'Perrin Lecture'. It holds twice yearly meetings for its members in various locations around the United Kingdom. The Institute itself is governed by a Board of five elected Trustees who are advised by an appointed Council of members.

Until early 2010 the national flag of the United Kingdom was only flown from the Houses of Parliament when Parliament was sitting, and when the Houses rose it was taken down and the flagpole left bare. The Flag Institute with the Flags and Heraldry Committee campaigned to see the flag flown permanently. In early 2010 Black Rod agreed that this should be so and since then the flag has flown all the time. The Flag Institute was congratulated by the Secretary of State for Communities and Local Government, Eric Pickles, on its first 40 years of service to the United Kingdom. 

Following a postal ballot of members, the Institute became a charity at its annual general meeting in Worcester on Saturday 17 November 2012.

UK Flag Registry
The Institute keeps a registry of flags for the countries, regions and counties of the UK. Flag designs with which its officers have been involved include those for the badge and ensign of the UK Border Agency and the flag of the UK Supreme Court.

All Scottish flags must, by law, be authorised by Lord Lyon and recorded in the Public Register of All Arms and Bearings in Scotland. The Earl Marshal and the College of Arms are legally responsible for flags in the rest of the UK. Both the College of Arms and the Court of Lord Lyon maintain their respective country's official register of flags. Flags and symbols relating to the military are regulated by the Crown through the Ministry of Defence, which also governs flags flown at sea by British-registered vessels.

Publications
In 2010 the Flag Institute, with the Parliamentary Flags and Heraldry Committee, published a guide to Britain's flag protocol, Flying Flags in the United Kingdom.

References

External links
 

International Federation of Vexillological Associations
Organizations established in 1971
Educational organisations based in the United Kingdom
Charities based in England
1971 establishments in the United Kingdom